Oleg I Ingvarevich the Red, or the Handsome, was Prince of Ryazan from 1252 to 1258.

References

Grand Princes of Ryazan
13th-century princes in Kievan Rus'